Alina Frasa (1834–1899) was a Finnish ballerina. She is regarded as the first ballerina in Finland.

Swiss-born Frasa was the adoptive daughter of the director of a travelling German theater. She made her debut in Finland as the member of a travelling theater during her childhood, and made a success by her ballet performances. In 1847, she settled in Borgå where she acted in the inauguration of the first theater of that city. From 1852, she was active in Helsinki, where she became a star. She is regarded to be the first ballet dancer in Finland and was noted by Aleksis Kivi. She retired in the 1860s, but founded a ballet school and came to be regarded as the first ballet instructor of note in Finland.

References

1834 births
1899 deaths
Finnish ballerinas
19th-century Finnish people
19th-century ballet dancers
Finnish adoptees
Finnish people of Swiss descent
19th-century Finnish women
Swiss emigrants to the Russian Empire